Ted T. Morioka (November 18, 1921 – April 17, 1992) was an American politician. He served as a Democratic member of the Hawaii House of Representatives.

Life and career 
Morioka was born in Honolulu, Hawaii. He attended Kauai High School.

In 1963, Morioka was elected to the Hawaii House of Representatives. He was an assistant majority floor leader in the 1970s.

Morioka died April 1992, at the age of 70.

References 

1921 births
1992 deaths
Politicians from Honolulu
Democratic Party members of the Hawaii House of Representatives
20th-century American politicians